P. Kilemsungla is an Indian educationist. She hails from Kohima, Nagaland. She is the first woman from Nagaland to be appointed as  member of the Union Public Service Commission. She has been selected for Padma Shri for her contribution in the field of literature and education.

Before being appointed as member of UPSC, she had served as a member of Nagaland Public Service Commission (NPSC) between 1 February 2007 and 12 September 2012 and also worked as acting chairperson of NPSC from 13 September 2012 till her retirement on 31 January. Kilemsungla, a noted educationist, has been a lecturer in Kohima Arts College and also taught at the Nagaland College of Teachers Education (NCTE). She was also Principal of District Institute of Educational Training, Government Polytechnic and then NCTE, Kohima.

References

Living people
Indian women educational theorists
People from Kohima
Indian civil servants
1951 births
Recipients of the Padma Shri in literature & education
20th-century Indian educational theorists
Women educators from Nagaland
Educators from Nagaland
20th-century women educators
20th-century Indian women